Jan Gunnar Røise (born 24 September 1975) is a Norwegian actor.

He was born in Eidsvoll, and took his education at the Norwegian National Academy of Theatre. He made his stage debut in 2000 at the National Theatre, and has been employed there since. Film appearances include Hawaii, Oslo and Gymnaslærer Pedersen. His latest feature film appearance was as Olav in the 2011 movie The Thing.

References

External links

1975 births
Living people
Oslo National Academy of the Arts alumni
People from Eidsvoll
Norwegian male stage actors
Norwegian male film actors